The 1965 Connecticut Huskies football team represented the University of Connecticut as a member of the Yankee Conference during the 1965 NCAA College Division football season. Led by second-year head coach Rick Forzano, Huskies compiled an overall record of 3–6 with a mark of 2–2 in conference play, tying for third place in the Yankee Conference.

Schedule

References

Connecticut
UConn Huskies football seasons
Connecticut Huskies football